Chama sinuosa, common name the Smooth-edged jewel box, is a species of bivalve mollusc in the family Chamidae, the jewel boxes. This species is found along the Atlantic coast of North America, from southern Florida to the West Indies.

References

Chamidae
Bivalves described in 1835